John Charles Lauer   (April 5, 1865 – May 4, 1915), was a Major League Baseball player who played outfield. He played from 1884–1890.

External links

1865 births
1915 deaths
Major League Baseball outfielders
Pittsburgh Alleghenys players
Chicago Colts players
19th-century baseball players
Pittsburgh Liberty Stars players
Zanesville Kickapoos players
Davenport Hawkeyes players
Toronto Canucks players
Evansville Hoosiers players
Tacoma Daisies players
Cleveland Forest Cities players
Baseball players from Pennsylvania